The demographics of Winnipeg reveal the city to be a typically Canadian one: multicultural and multilingual. Winnipeg is also prominent in the size and ratio of its First Nations population, which plays an important part in the city's makeup. About 12.4% of Winnipeggers are of Indigenous descent, which vastly exceeds the national average of 5.0%.

Population 
As of the Canada 2021 Census there were 749,607 people living in the City of Winnipeg, with 834,678 living in the Winnipeg Census Metropolitan Area. The median age of the population is 39 years old and the average is 40.

Ethnicity

City of Winnipeg 

There is a large Indigenous community in Winnipeg. Per capita, Winnipeg has more Indigenous residents (12.4%) than any other major Canadian city (population 100,000+). Despite being only the seventh-largest city in Canada, Winnipeg has the largest total population of urban and off-reserve Indigenous people in one city (90,995), including the largest total Métis population (47,915), and the largest total First Nations population (40,290). Per capita, Winnipeg is the Canadian city with the fourth-largest First Nations population (5.5%) and the largest Métis population (6.5%).

Winnipeg also has the largest Filipino population (11.3%) of any major Canadian city, though the Toronto Filipino community is larger in absolute numbers (170,355 in Toronto, relative to 83,305 in Winnipeg). Winnipeg's Filipino population is largely concentrated in the West End and North End areas of the city. The neighbourhood around Sargent Avenue and Arlington Street is 45% Filipino, and the neighborhood around Sargent Avenue and Wall Street is 47% Filipino.

Winnipeg also has the largest multiracial population of any large Canadian city. There are 45,005 people of mixed race backgrounds in Winnipeg, making that both the highest ratio (6.9%) and in total numbers (Toronto is second with 42,795).  This figure does not count Winnipegers of Métis background.

Note: Totals greater than 100% due to multiple origin responses.

Metro Winnipeg 

Note: Totals greater than 100% due to multiple origin responses.

Future projections

Language

City of Winnipeg 
In 2011, Tagalog was officially the second most common mother tongue in Winnipeg, accounting for about 5% of the population, followed by French which is the mother-tongue for about 4% of the population.

Metro Winnipeg 
The question on knowledge of languages allows for multiple responses. The following figures are from the 2021 Canadian Census, and lists languages that were selected by at least 1,000 respondents.

Religion 

In 2001, 21% of Winnipeg was not religious. Ten years later, in 2011, 28.7% of the population was not religious (about 32% of males and 26% of females). The trend continued into 2021, when 36.4% of residents reported no religion or secular perspectives. The largest religion was Christianity, at 50.4% of residents (63.7% in 2011). 24.0% were Catholic, 12.9% were Protestant, 8.9% were Christians of unspecified denomination, 1.7% were Orthodox Christians, and 3.0% were Other Christian (/Other Christian Related Traditions.) After Christianity, the next largest religion in Winnipeg was Sikhism, which grew from 1.5% to 4.4% of the population between 2011 and 2021.  Muslims were 3.3% of the population (1.7% in 2011), Hindus were 2.0% (1.1% in 2011) , Jewish People were 1.5% (1.6% in 2011), Buddhists were 0.9% (1.0% in 2011) Adherents of Traditional (North American Indigenous) spirituality were 0.4% (0.3% in 2011) and Other Religions/Spiritual Traditions were 0.7% (0.4% in 2011.)

Immigration 
According to the 2011 National Household Survey, in the 10 year period 2001 to 2011, Winnipeg had 62,200 immigrants, which is just under 10% of the population (9.6%). Most of these (44,780) came in the last 5 years of that period.

Income
The 2011 National Household Survey data showed that Winnipeg's after-tax median household income was $50,537. This was slightly lower than the national average ($54,098), and is in the bottom 10 of lowest median incomes in Canada. A study in 2013 showed that Winnipeg had two of the three poorest postal code areas in all of Canada (R3A and R3B, both located in the inner city) in regards to family income; in fact these are the two poorest that are located in cities (the poorest was a First Nations reserve in the Cape Breton area).

8,610 of Winnipeg's residents (who earn income) make and keep over $100,000 a year, which is 1.7% of the population. This ratio is higher nationally, at 2.6%.

The gender differences in income were less in Winnipeg by about 9% compared to the national medians. The median income for males in Winnipeg is $31,300, whereas for females the median is $23,739. This means a typical male makes about 31.9% more money than a typical female. This ratio is 40.5% nationwide.

Education
According to the 2011 National Household survey, for those aged 25 to 64;
 12.7% had no diploma, degree or certificate 
 87.3% had a high school diploma (or equivalent)
 62.1% had a post-secondary education
 34.0% had a university education
 28.1% had a non-university education (trades, colleges, apprenticeships, etc.)

Notes

References

Winnipeg
Winnipeg